Cercanías Asturias is a commuter rail service operating in Autonomous Community of Asturias, mainly in the central area of the region.

Lines with Iberian gauge 
There are three lines, all of them managed by Renfe Operadora:

Lines with Metre gauge 

There are six lines, all of them managed by FEVE:

Usage 
The following graph shows the number of tickets validated per year. Data for 1993 is not available. Data from 2020 and 2021 is not yet official, but information reported by local media.

Future developments
The ongoing Metrotrén Asturias project has been begun and stalled throughout its duration, and is currently expected to be completed by 2023.

See also 
 Cercanías
 Metrotrén Asturias

References

External links 
 Cercanías de Asturias website
 FEVE website

Cercanías
Transport in Asturias